Saunders College of Business (or SCB) (formerly known as The E. Philip Saunders College of Business) is one of eleven colleges at Rochester Institute of Technology and is accredited by the Association to Advance Collegiate Schools of Business International (AACSB). As of fall semester 2018, Saunders College of Business encompasses nearly 11% of RIT's enrollment, home to more than 2,000 undergraduate and graduate students enrolled in programs across RIT Global Campuses in Rochester, New York, Croatia, Dubai, Kosovo, and China.

Saunders College works in partnership with RIT’s entrepreneurial Venture Creations incubator and Albert J. Simone Center for Student Innovation and Entrepreneurship to integrate business education with RIT’s technical and creative programs. Saunders College offers undergraduate (BS), Masters (MS), Masters of Business Administration (MBA), and Executive MBA (EMBA) programs.

History
The college dates back to 1910 with the establishment of the food administration and home economics departments at RIT. In 1952, RIT acquired the McKechnie-Lunger School of Commerce in Rochester, which was renamed after E. Philip Saunders in 2006.  The college's dean is Jacqueline R. Mozrall. Hospitality and Tourism and Service Leadership programs were transitioned into the college from the College of Engineering Technology on July 1, 2019

Undergraduate programs
 Accounting
 Accounting BS/MBA 
 Business Administration*
 Business Analytics*
 Digital Business*
 Entrepreneurship*
 Finance
 Hospitality and Tourism Management
 Human Resource Management*
 International Business
 Management
 Management Information Systems
 Marketing
 Supply Chain Management
 Business Exploration
* Business minors only

Graduate programs
Masters in Business Administration (MBA)
 MBA
 Accelerated 4+1 MBA

Executive Education
 Executive MBA, on campus (EMBA)
 Executive MBA, online (OLEMBA)

Master of Science (MS)
 MS - Accounting
 MS - Business Analytics
 MS - Technology Innovation Management and Entrepreneurship
 MS - Finance
 MS - Global Supply Chain Management
 MS - Hospitality and Tourism
 MS - Management

Advanced Certificates

 Accounting and Financial Analytics
 Organizational Learning
 Service Leadership and Innovation
 Technology Entrepreneurship

Research facilities

Center for Student Innovation and Entrepreneurship
The Albert J. Simone Center for Student Innovation and Entrepreneurship was established in 2007. It was named for Albert J. Simone, 8th president of RIT, in recognition of his contribution to academics and strong support of local business.

Center for Urban Entrepreneurship
The Center for Urban Entrepreneurship (CUE) is located in the downtown business district at 40 Franklin Street (the historic Rochester Savings Bank).

Leadership Academy @ Saunders
The leadership academy fosters innovative leadership for bridging business and technology. The academy is available to high school, undergraduate and graduate students, as well as alumni and employers.

Technology Management Center
The Technology Management Center focuses on three primary areas: information technology management, new product development, and science and technology policy. The center does basic and applied research and develops new teaching material in the area of Technology Innovation.

Institute for Business Ethics and Corporate Social Responsibility
The Institute for Business Ethics and Corporate social responsibility supports research and teaching at Saunders and focuses on the interdependent relationship between business and society.

Venture Creations
The Venture Creations incubator at RIT is a place where early to mid-seed stage companies can advance their concepts on the way to joining the ranks of profitable, viable businesses in New York State. Saunders students and faculty engage with VCI companies through Saunders Consulting Group, Capstone Projects, and provide additional real-world business exposure to the classroom.

Rankings

Undergraduate programs
College Factual #3 in the 2021 rankings of Management Information Systems degree programs and #5 for Best Value Colleges for Management Information Systems in the Middle Atlantic Region.

U.S. News & World Report #67 in the 2021 rankings of top undergraduate business programs.

Poets & Quants #58 in the 2021 Best Undergraduate Business Programs and #28 in employment outcomes.

Graduate programs
Times Higher Education’s World University Rankings, #54 in the 2019 THE/WSJ Business School Report: Two-Year MBA Degrees.

U.S. News & World Report #89 in the 2021 best business schools.

Poets & Quants #95 in the 2020-2021 U.S. MBA program rankings.

Bloomberg Businessweek #93 on list of 2020-2021 best U.S. business schools with full-time MBA programs.

Online graduate programs

Princeton Review #17  in 2021 top 50 online MBA programs

U.S. News & World Report #20 in 2021 online MBA rankings

Notable alumni
 William A. Buckingham (1964) –  retired Executive Vice President of M&T Bank
 Daniel Carp (1973) – former Chairman and CEO of the Eastman Kodak Company
Bal Dixit (1974) – Founder and Chairman of Newtex Industries, Inc.
 Tom Curley (1977) – President and CEO, Associated Press
 Jeffrey K. Harris (1975) – served as 11th Director of the National Reconnaissance Office
 Mike Rundle – co-founder, 9rules Network
 Kevin Surace (1985) – CEO of Appvance; 2009 Inc. Magazine Entrepreneur of the Year; CNBC Innovator of the Decade

See also
 List of business schools in the United States
 Rochester Institute of Technology

References

External links
 
Social Media Directory
 Rochester Institute of Technology
 The Albert J. Simone Center for Innovation and Entrepreneurship
 Institute for Business Ethics and Corporate Social Responsibility

Business schools in New York (state)
Rochester Institute of Technology colleges
Educational institutions established in 1952
1952 establishments in New York (state)